Mathieu Ravignat (born January 18, 1973) is a Canadian federal politician from Cantley, Quebec, Canada, who was elected to the House of Commons of Canada from the riding of Pontiac in the May 2, 2011 federal election.  He is a member of the New Democratic Party, which formed the official opposition in the 41st Canadian Parliament. He was defeated by Liberal Will Amos in the 2015 Canadian federal election.

Early life
Of Belgian descent and raised in Gracefield, Quebec and Orleans, Ontario, Ravignat received a master's degree in political science.  He co-founded Local 2626 of the Canadian Union of Public Employees, the labour union that represents student employees of the University of Ottawa.  At the time of his election to Parliament, Ravignat was a federal government researcher for aboriginal and environmental issues.

Political career
Ravignat first ran for a seat as an independent candidate in the 1997 federal election.  Ravignat ran in the riding of Laurier—Sainte-Marie finishing in last place out of eight candidates earning 123 votes. He was soundly defeated by Bloc Québécois leader Gilles Duceppe.

Ravignat ran for his second time as a New Democratic Party candidate in the 2011 federal election. He was nominated by the party to contest the riding of Pontiac. On election night, he won his first term in office and picked up the seat for his party by defeating Conservative Foreign Affairs Minister Lawrence Cannon, despite the Conservative Party gaining its first majority government in the election. He was defeated by Liberal Will Amos in the 2015 Canadian federal election.

Martial arts
Ravignat is a sensei at the Daijiken Traditional Karate Association which he founded in Wakefield, Quebec.  He is also one of the founders of the Canada Hokubei Karate-jutsu and Kobu-jutsu Association, a national martial arts organization affiliated with the North America Karate-jutsu Kobu-jutsu Association and with the International Kenshi-kai Organisation (IKO) headquartered in Okinawa, Japan.

Honours

Awarded heraldic crest, banner and flag by Queen Elizabeth II.

Awarded the Queen's Diamond Jubilee Medal, 2012.

Awarded the Sovereign's Medal for Volunteers, 2018.

Electoral record

References

External links

Mathieu Ravignat candidate page

Members of the House of Commons of Canada from Quebec
New Democratic Party MPs
Independent candidates in the 1997 Canadian federal election
Living people
1973 births
University of Ottawa alumni
Politicians from Ottawa
People from Outaouais
21st-century Canadian politicians